Morris McNeil Musselman (February 19, 1899 - April 22, 1952) was a Hollywood screenwriter and writer.

Bibliography
The honeymoon is over, a comedy in one act (1941)
Wheels in His Head; father and his inventions (1945) Biography of his father, the inventor, A. J. Musselman.
It Took Nine Tailors (1948) Autobiography of Adolphe Menjou. Foreword by Clark Gable.
Get A Horse! - The Story Of The Automobile In America (1950)
I Married A Redhead (1951)
Second Honeymoon (1952)

Filmography
The Bride Came C.O.D. (1941) 
The Three Musketeers (1939)

Quotes
"One of the best things about marriage is that it gets young people to bed at a decent hour."

References

External links
 
 Entry at OpenLibrary

1899 births
1952 deaths
20th-century American screenwriters